First Presbyterian Church is a historic Presbyterian church at 215 East Commerce Street in Greenville, Alabama.  It was built in 1886 and added to the National Register of Historic Places in 1986.  The church is a member of the Presbyterian Church in America.

References

Presbyterian Church in America churches in Alabama
Churches on the National Register of Historic Places in Alabama
Romanesque Revival church buildings in Alabama
Churches completed in 1886
Churches in Butler County, Alabama
Greenville, Alabama
National Register of Historic Places in Butler County, Alabama
1886 establishments in Alabama